The women's 1.5 kilometre sprint classic competition of the 2018 Winter Paralympics was held at Alpensia Biathlon Centre in Pyeongchang. The competition took place on 14 March 2018.

Medal table

Visually impaired

Qualification
The qualification was held at 11:25.

Semifinals
Semifinal 1

Semifinal 2

Final
The final was held at 14:16.

Standing

Qualification
The qualification was held at 10:50.

Semifinals
Semifinal 1

Semifinal 2

Final
The final was held at 13:48.

Sitting

Qualification
The qualification was held at 10:17.

Semifinals
Semifinal 1

Semifinal 2

Final
The final was held at 13:20.

See also
Cross-country skiing at the 2018 Winter Olympics

References

Women's 1.5 kilometre sprint classical
Para